Alam Bridge inscriptions refers to the archaeological inscriptions on the rocks, near the Alam Bridge. The inscriptions are in Kharoshti and Brahmi script, and are mostly animal carvings and Stupas.

References

External Links 

Archaeological sites in Gilgit-Baltistan
History of Gilgit-Baltistan
Monuments and memorials in Gilgit-Baltistan
Buildings and structures in Gilgit-Baltistan